The National Noh Theatre (国立能楽堂, Kokuritsu Nōgaku Dō) opened in Sendagaya, Shibuya, Tokyo, Japan in September 1983. The auditorium seats 591 for performances of Noh and Kyōgen, and there is also a rehearsal stage, exhibition area, lecture room, and reference library. In 2007, the National Noh Theatre began to annually present regular programs by female performers.

See also
 Noh

References

External links
  National Noh Theatre - homepage
  National Noh Theatre - English language site

Theatres in Tokyo
Arts centres in Japan
Noh
Buildings and structures in Shibuya
Theatres completed in 1983
1983 establishments in Japan